The Embassy of the State of Palestine in Iran is the diplomatic mission of the Palestine in Iran managed by the Palestine Liberation Organization. It is located in Palestine Street in Tehran. 

From 1948 to 1979, this diplomatic mission was known as the Embassy of the State of Israel in Tehran when Iran and Israel had diplomatic relations until the Iranian Revolution.

See also

List of diplomatic missions in Iran.
List of diplomatic missions of Palestine.

References

Iran
Palestine
Iran–State of Palestine relations